Randolph Edward Moore (June 21, 1906 – June 12, 1992) was an American professional baseball outfielder. He played in Major League Baseball (MLB) for the Chicago White Sox, Boston Braves, Brooklyn Dodgers, and St. Louis Cardinals between 1927 and 1937.

He finished 23rd in voting for the 1933 National League MVP for playing in 135 Games and having 497 At Bats, 64 Runs, 150 Hits, 23 Doubles, 7 Triples, 8 Home Runs, 70 RBI, 3 Stolen Bases, 40 Walks, .302 Batting Average, .356 On-base percentage, .425 Slugging Percentage, 211 Total Bases and 9 Sacrifice Hits.

In 10 seasons he played in 749 Games and had 2,253 At Bats, 258 Runs, 627 Hits, 110 Doubles, 17 Triples, 27 Home Runs, 308 RBI, 11 Stolen Bases, 158 Walks, .278 Batting Average, .326 On-base percentage, .378 Slugging Percentage, 852 Total Bases and 30 Sacrifice hits.

He died in Mt. Pleasant, Texas at the age of 85.

References

Sources

1906 births
1992 deaths
Chicago White Sox players
Boston Braves players
Brooklyn Dodgers players
St. Louis Cardinals players
Major League Baseball right fielders
Baseball players from Texas
Mount Pleasant Cats players
Longview Cannibals players
Waco Cubs players
Dallas Steers players
People from Naples, Texas